The SAPROF (Structured Assessment of PROtective Factors for violence risk) is a Structured Professional Judgment (SPJ) tool developed to assess the protective factors for violence risk in adult offenders. The tool complements other risk assessment and actuarial tools used to assess the risk of future violent behaviour by an offender.

Development 

SAPROF was developed in the Netherlands in 2007 as an instrument for the structured assessment of protective factors for violence risk. Following the Structured Professional Judgment (SPJ) model, the SAPROF was designed as a positive addition to other SPJ risk assessment tools, such as the HCR-20 (Historical Clinical Risk - 20; Webster, Douglas, Eaves & Hart, 1997), creating a more balanced assessment of risk for future (sexual) violence. 

The SAPROF aims to contribute to an increasingly accurate and well-rounded assessment of risk for future violent behaviour. The dynamic positive approach of protective factors aims to create new opportunities for effective and achievable treatment interventions.
Retrospective results at the Van der Hoeven Kliniek in The Netherlands show good interrater reliability and good predictive validity for violent recidivism.

Frequent users of the SAPROF in forensic psychiatry state that the instrument can be helpful in formulating treatment goals, justifying stages of treatment, atoning treatment phasing and facilitating risk communication (Van den Broek & De Vries Robbé, 2008).

Vivienne de Vogel, Corine de Ruiter, Yvonne Bouman and Michiel de Vries Robbé (2007) originally developed the SAPROF in Dutch and in 2009 the English Version was published. A German version will be published end of 2009.

References

General references 

Vogel, V. de, Ruiter, C. de, Bouman, Y., & Vries Robbé, M. de (2007). Handleiding bij de SAPROF. Structured Assessment of PROtective Factors for Violence Risk. Versie 1. Utrecht: Forum Educatief.

Vogel, V. de, Ruiter, C. de, Bouman, Y., & Vries Robbé, M. de (2009). SAPROF. Guidelines for the assessment of protective factors for violence risk. English Version. Utrecht, The Netherlands: Forum Educatief.

Vogel, V. de, Vries Robbé, M. de, Ruiter, C. de, & Bouman, Y.H.A. (under review). Assessing protective factors in forensic psychiatric practice. An introduction to the SAPROF.

Vries Robbé, M. de, & Vogel, V. de (2009). Assessing protective factors for (sexual) violence: Research results with The SAPROF. Paper presented at the ninth Conference of the International Association of Forensic Mental Health Services, Edinburgh, Scotland.

Vries Robbé, M. de, Vogel, V. de, & Spa, E. de (under review). Protective factors for violence risk in forensic psychiatric patients. A retrospective validation study of the SAPROF.

Webster, C. D., Douglas, K. S., Eaves, D., & Hart, S. D. (1997). HCR-20: Assessing the risk of violence. Version 2. Vancouver, Canada: Simon Fraser University and BC Forensic Psychiatric Services Commission.

Further reading

External links 

 www.saprof.com - SAPROF: Structured Assessment of Protective Factors for violence risk

Mental disorders screening and assessment tools